Yan Pak is a former Chinese actress from Hong Kong. Pak is credited with over 55 films and many TVB series.

Early life 
On November 30, 1942, Pak was born as Wai-yin Chan in Kuala Lumpur, Malaysia.

Career 
In 1959, Pak became a Hong Kong actress and debuted in The Fake Marriage (aka Great Pretender), a 1959 Comedy film directed by Lo Duen. Pak was a lead actress in many Drama and Comedy films including Affectionately Yours (1960), The Great Devotion (aka Love Cannot Read)(1960), So Siu Siu (1962), The Eternal Beauty of Hsi-Shih (aka Hsi Shih: The Beauty of Beauty)(1965), and Chicken and Duck Talk (1988). Pak's last film was Street Angels, a 1996 Triad film directed by Billy Tang Hin-Shing. In 1980s, Pak joined TVB and became active in television series including The Duke of Mount Deer (1984 TV series), The Return of Luk Siu Fung (1986 TV series), and All That is Bitter is Sweet (2014 TV Series). In 2012, Pak retired from acting. Pak's last television series was in 2014. Pak is credited with over 55 films and many TVB series.

Filmography

Films 
This is a partial list of films.
 1959 The Fake Marriage (aka Great Pretender) 
 1960 Affectionately Yours 
 1960 The Great Devotion (aka Love Cannot Read) 
 1962 So Siu Siu 
 1965 The Eternal Beauty of Hsi-Shih (aka Hsi Shih: The Beauty of Beauty) 
 1967 The Divorce Brinkmanship 
 1994 Drunken Master II (aka Drunken Master 2, Legend of the Drunken Master) - Mrs Chan
 1988 Chicken and Duck Talk - Tammy's mother.

Television 
This is a partial list of TV series. Pak is mostly credited as Bak Yan.
 1981 Yeung Female Warriors (TV series) -Princess Chai 
 1984 The Duke of Mount Deer (TV series)
 1986 The Return of Luk Siu Fung (TV series)
 1986 New Heavenly Sword and Dragon Sabre (TV series) - Wong Nan Gu 
 2012 Silver Spoon, Sterling Shackles (TV series)
 2014 All That is Bitter is Sweet (TV Series) - Ling Fung Yee

Personal life 
Pak's husband is Wong Man-wai, a footballer who competed at the 1960 Summer Olympics.

References

External links 
 Yan Pak at imdb.com

1942 births
Hong Kong film actresses
Hong Kong television actresses
Living people